Fetter is a surname. Notable people with the surname include:

 Alexander Fetter (born 1937), American physicist
 Chris Fetter (born 1985), American baseball coach
 Ellen Fetter, American computer scientist
 Erik Fetter (born 2000), Hungarian cyclist
 Frank Fetter (1863–1949), American economist and professor
 György Fetter (born 1963), Hungarian sprinter
 Leigh Ann Fetter (born 1969), American swimmer
 Ted Fetter (1906–1996), Broadway lyricist
 Trevor Fetter, American businessman
 William Fetter (1928–2002), American graphic designer

See also
 Fetters (surname)